The Philippines worm eel (Muraenichthys philippinensis) is an eel in the family Ophichthidae (worm/snake eels). It was described by Leonard Peter Schultz and Loren Paul Woods in 1949. It is a marine, tropical eel which is known from the Philippines (from which its species epithet and common name are derived), in the western central Pacific Ocean.

References

Fish described in 1949
Muraneichthys